McLain R. Toole (born March 8, 1946) is an American politician. He is a former member of the South Carolina House of Representatives from the 88th District, serving from 2002 to 2020. He is a member of the Republican Party.

References

Living people
1946 births
Republican Party members of the South Carolina House of Representatives
21st-century American politicians